The 1976 Arkansas gubernatorial election was held on Tuesday November 2, Incumbent Governor David Pryor defeated Republican candidate Leon Griffith with 83.24% of the vote.

Primary elections
Primary elections were held on May 25, 1976.

Democratic primary

Candidates
David Pryor, incumbent Governor
Jim Lindsey, Real Estate developer and former University of Arkansas and Minnesota Vikings football player
Frank Lady, Attorney and former State Representative
John H. (Tuffy) Chambers, farmer

Results

Republican primary

Candidates
Leon Griffith, master plumber
Joseph H. Weston, editor of the Sharp Citizen

Results

General election

Candidates
David Pryor, Democratic
Leon Griffith, Republican

Results

References

Bibliography
 
 
 
 

1976
Arkansas
Gubernatorial
November 1976 events in the United States